El Capitan High School (commonly known as El Cap) is a public high school in Lakeside, California, United States, a census-designated place in San Diego, and serves students in grades nine through twelve. Opened in 1959, El Capitan is the fifth of twelve high schools to be constructed in the Grossmont Union High School District. El Capitan High School is accredited by the Western Association of Schools and Colleges.

History
As of 2008, El Capitan High School is the only high school in the Grossmont Union High School District to feature an agriculture program. In September 2018, construction began on an $11 million event center that included an event space, lobby and concession areas, band room, practice room, dance studio, and drama classroom. The construction of the event center was completed in December 2019.

Students

Rankings
For the 2017–2018 school year, El Capitan High School ranked 9th out of 17 ranked high schools in the district, 13th out of 134 in the San Diego metropolitan area, 801st out of 1,612 in the state of California, and 5,997th out of 17,792 in the United States according to the U.S. News & World Report. For their 2021 rankings, Niche ranked the school 437th among 2,572 California high schools.

Athletics
The school fields teams in the following sports: football, baseball, basketball, cross country, field hockey, golf, soccer, tennis, track & field, volleyball, water polo and wrestling.

In 2014, the varsity football team enjoyed its best performance in school history. After an upset victory against Helix High School, a Division I team, El Capitan finished the regular season undefeated at 10–0. Defeating Mt. Carmel and Brawley, the school would win its first CIF San Diego Section Division II championship in a 14–7 victory against Rancho Bernardo High School. However, El Capitan suffered its first and only defeat of the season in the Division III state championship game when it was defeated 35–28 by Campolindo.

In 2016, the girls varsity volleyball team finished the season 25–5 and won its first San Diego Section Division III championship.

Notable alumni
 Ashli Babbitt, protester killed in the 2021 United States Capitol attack
 Jeff Byrd, pitcher for the Toronto Blue Jays
 Kevin Ginkel, pitcher in Major League Baseball for the Arizona Diamondbacks
 Delanie Gourley, softball pitcher
 Matt LaChappa, minor league pitcher for the San Diego Padres
 Ryan Lindley, quarterback for the Arizona Cardinals
 Nic Long, Olympic cyclist
 Jaime Preciado, bass player for Pierce The Veil
 Stacie Terry-Hutson (class of 1994), college basketball coach and women's basketball head coach at San Diego State (2013–present)

See also

List of high schools in San Diego County, California
List of high schools in California

References

External links
El Capitan High School

1959 establishments in California
Educational institutions established in 1959
High schools in San Diego County, California
Public high schools in California